Stephen Barrett (born ) is an Irish male  track cyclist, riding for the national team. He competed in the team pursuit event at the 2010 UCI Track Cycling World Championships.

References

External links
 Profile at cyclingarchives.com

1985 births
Living people
Irish track cyclists
Irish male cyclists
Place of birth missing (living people)